Paul Schmitthenner (born Lauterburg, Elsass-Lothringen, Germany 15 December 1884 – 11 November 1972) was a German architect, city planner and Professor at the University of Stuttgart.

During Nazi Germany, Schmitthenner was one of Adolf Hitler's architects.

Early life and education 
He studied at the technical universities of Karlsruhe and Munich and later became a Professor at the University of Stuttgart, where he formed together with Paul Bonatz the architectural style of the Stuttgart School.

Architecture 
His belief that the traditional methods and styles in architecture revealed best the German character led to his appointment as expert group leader for fine arts in the Kampfbund. Schmitthenner was in open opposition to modern architects like Walter Gropius. For him, Goethe's cottage at Weimar was still the ideal type of the German residential building. However, despite official approval, his enthusiasm did not bring many large commissions.

He had to leave his chair at the University after the war without a pension and worked as an architect till the end of his life. In Stuttgart, he built the "Königin-Olga-Bau" for the Dresdner Bank in 1950.

Works 
Baugestaltung. Das Deutsche Wohnhaus, 1932.

See also
 Nazi architecture

External links 

 
 Review of the book by Voigt/Frank by Stella Hoepner-Fillies
 Restoration of the "architect's garden" by Paul Schmitthenner, Am Fischtal 4
 Bericht über die Werkschau im Deutschen Architekturmuseum. In: Die Welt. 17. September 2003.

1884 births
1972 deaths
People from Bas-Rhin
20th-century German architects
People from Alsace-Lorraine
Knights Commander of the Order of Merit of the Federal Republic of Germany
Recipients of the Pour le Mérite (civil class)
Technical University of Munich alumni
Academic staff of the University of Stuttgart
Academic staff of the Technical University of Berlin
Academic staff of the University of Tübingen